Funny Farm was a Canadian television series shown on CTV during the 1974–1975 season.

Blake Emmons was host of the half-hour series, which was derivative of the more successful American Hee Haw series. The first episode was broadcast on 12 September 1974 and only one season was produced. The programme continued to be broadcast on CTV for at least two seasons, and was still airing as late as 1976. The cast included Bruce Gordon (credited as Ben Gordon), John Evans, Monica Parker, Yank Azman (credited as Jank Zajfman), Jayne Eastwood, Valri Bromfield and Linda Rennhoffer.

References
 

Canadian Communications Foundation: The Funny Farm
TVArchive.ca: The Funny Farm

External links 

 

1974 Canadian television series debuts
1975 Canadian television series endings
CTV Television Network original programming
1970s Canadian sketch comedy television series